The 8th Golden Satellite Awards, honoring the best in film and television of 2003, were presented by the International Press Academy on February 21, 2004.

Special achievement awards
Mary Pickford Award (55 industry) – Arnon Milchan

Nikola Tesla Award (for his stand-out effects and 3D lens innovations) – James Cameron

Special Achievement Award (for outstanding talent) – Peter Dinklage

Motion picture winners and nominees

Best Actor – Drama
Sean Penn – 21 Grams and Mystic River
 Hayden Christensen – Shattered Glass
 Paddy Considine – In America
 Tom Cruise – The Last Samurai
 Jude Law – Cold Mountain
 William H. Macy – The Cooler

Best Actor – Musical or Comedy
Bill Murray – Lost in Translation
 Jack Black – School of Rock
 Johnny Depp – Pirates of the Caribbean: The Curse of the Black Pearl
 Robert Downey Jr. – The Singing Detective
 Paul Giamatti – American Splendor
 Billy Bob Thornton – Bad Santa

Best Actress – Drama
Charlize Theron – Monster
 Jennifer Connelly – House of Sand and Fog
 Toni Collette – Japanese Story
 Samantha Morton – In America
 Nikki Reed – Thirteen
 Naomi Watts – 21 Grams
 Evan Rachel Wood – Thirteen

Best Actress – Musical or Comedy
Diane Keaton – Something's Gotta Give
 Jamie Lee Curtis – Freaky Friday
 Hope Davis – American Splendor
 Katie Holmes – Pieces of April
 Diane Lane – Under the Tuscan Sun
 Helen Mirren – Calendar Girls

Best Animated or Mixed Media Film
 The Triplets of Belleville (Les triplettes de Belleville)
 Brother Bear
 Finding Nemo
 Looney Tunes: Back in Action
 Millennium Actress (Sennen joyû)
 Sinbad: Legend of the Seven Seas

Best Art Direction and Production Design
 The Lord of the Rings: The Return of the King
 Kill Bill: Volume 1
 The Last Samurai
 Master and Commander: The Far Side of the World
 Seabiscuit
 Whale Rider

Best Cinematography
 The Last Samurai – John Toll
 Girl with a Pearl Earring
 The Lord of the Rings: The Return of the King
 Master and Commander: The Far Side of the World
 Mystic River
 Seabiscuit

Best Costume Design
 The Last Samurai – Ngila Dickson
 The Company
 The Lord of the Rings: The Return of the King
 Master and Commander: The Far Side of the World
 Pirates of the Caribbean: The Curse of the Black Pearl
 Seabiscuit

Best Director
Jim Sheridan – In America
 Shari Springer Berman and Robert Pulcini – American Splendor
 Niki Caro – Whale Rider
 Sofia Coppola – Lost in Translation
 Clint Eastwood – Mystic River
 Catherine Hardwicke – Thirteen

Best Documentary Film
 Amandla!: A Revolution in Four-Part Harmony
 Capturing the Friedmans
 The Fog of War: Eleven Lessons from the Life of Robert S. McNamara
 Lost in La Mancha
 My Flesh and Blood
 Stevie

Best Editing
 The Last Samurai – Victor Du Bois and Steven Rosenblum
 House of Sand and Fog
 The Lord of the Rings: The Return of the King
 Master and Commander: The Far Side of the World
 Mystic River
 Seabiscuit

Best Film – Drama
 In America
 The Last Samurai
 The Lord of the Rings: The Return of the King
 Master and Commander: The Far Side of the World
 Mystic River
 Thirteen
 Whale Rider

Best Film – Musical or Comedy
 Lost in Translation
 American Splendor
 Bad Santa
 Bend It Like Beckham
 A Mighty Wind
 Pirates of the Caribbean: The Curse of the Black Pearl

Best Foreign Language Film
 City of God (Cidade de Deus), Brazil
 The Barbarian Invasions (Les invasions barbares), Canada
 Gloomy Sunday (Gloomy Sunday – Ein Lied von Liebe und Tod), Germany
 Monsieur Ibrahim (Monsieur Ibrahim et les fleurs du Coran), France
 Osama, Afghanistan/Iran
 Spring, Summer, Autumn, Winter... and Spring (Bom yeoreum gaeul gyeoul geurigo bom), Korea

Best Original Score
 "The Last Samurai" – Hans Zimmer
"Camp" – Stephen Trask
"Cold Mountain" – Gabriel Yared
"Finding Nemo" – Thomas Newman
"The Lord of the Rings: The Return of the King" – Howard Shore
"The Missing" – James Horner
"Seabiscuit" – Randy Newman

Best Original Song
 "Siente mi amor" – Once Upon a Time in Mexico
"Cross the Green Mountain" – Gods and Generals
"Great Spirits" – Brother Bear
"The Heart of Every Girl" – Mona Lisa Smile
"How Shall I See You Through My Tears" – Camp
"A Kiss at the End of the Rainbow" – A Mighty Wind

Best Screenplay – Adapted
 Mystic River – Brian Helgeland
 American Splendor – Shari Springer Berman and Robert Pulcini
 Cold Mountain – Anthony Minghella
 Seabiscuit – Gary Ross
 Shattered Glass – Billy Ray
 Whale Rider – Niki Caro

Best Screenplay – Original
 Lost in Translation – Sofia Coppola
 21 Grams – Guillermo Arriaga
 The Cooler – Frank Hannah and Wayne Kramer
 Kill Bill: Volume 1 – Quentin Tarantino and Uma Thurman
 The Station Agent – Tom McCarthy
 Thirteen – Catherine Hardwicke and Nikki Reed

Best Sound
 Master and Commander: The Far Side of the World
 Kill Bill: Volume 1
 The Last Samurai
 The Lord of the Rings: The Return of the King
 Mystic River
 Seabiscuit

Best Supporting Actor – Drama
Djimon Hounsou – In America
 Alec Baldwin – The Cooler
 Jeff Bridges – Seabiscuit
 Benicio del Toro – 21 Grams
 Omar Sharif – Monsieur Ibrahim (Monsieur Ibrahim el les fleurs du Coran)
 Ken Watanabe – The Last Samurai

Best Supporting Actor – Musical or Comedy
Eugene Levy – A Mighty Wind
 Johnny Depp – Once Upon a Time in Mexico
 Bill Nighy – Love Actually
 Sam Rockwell – Matchstick Men
 Geoffrey Rush – Pirates of the Caribbean: The Curse of the Black Pearl
 Thomas Sangster – Love Actually

Best Supporting Actress – Drama
Maria Bello – The Cooler
 Emma Bolger – In America
 Annette Bening – Open Range
 Patricia Clarkson – The Station Agent
 Marcia Gay Harden – Mystic River
 Holly Hunter – Thirteen

Best Supporting Actress – Musical or Comedy
Patricia Clarkson – Pieces of April
 Shaheen Khan – Bend It Like Beckham
 Scarlett Johansson – Lost in Translation
 Catherine O'Hara – A Mighty Wind
 Emma Thompson – Love Actually
 Julie Walters – Calendar Girls

Best Visual Effects
 Master and Commander: The Far Side of the World
 Kill Bill: Volume 1
 The Last Samurai
 The Lord of the Rings: The Return of the King
 Pirates of the Caribbean: The Curse of the Black Pearl
 Terminator 3: Rise of the Machines

Television winners and nominees

Best Actor – Drama Series
Michael Chiklis – The Shield
 David Boreanaz – Angel
 Anthony LaPaglia – Without a Trace
 Julian McMahon – Nip/Tuck
 David Paymer – Line of Fire
 Nick Stahl – Carnivàle

Best Actor – Musical or Comedy Series
Bernie Mac – The Bernie Mac Show
 Sacha Baron Cohen – Da Ali G Show
 Bryan Cranston – Malcolm in the Middle
 Larry David – Curb Your Enthusiasm
 Eric McCormack – Will & Grace
 Tony Shalhoub – Monk

Best Actor – Miniseries or TV Film
James Woods – Rudy: The Rudy Giuliani Story
 Robert Carlyle – Hitler: The Rise of Evil
 Troy Garity – Soldier's Girl
 Lee Pace – Soldier's Girl
 Al Pacino – Angels in America
 Tom Wilkinson – Normal

Best Actress – Drama Series
CCH Pounder – The Shield
 Jennifer Garner – Alias
 Amy Madigan – Carnivàle
 Ellen Muth – Dead Like Me
 Joely Richardson – Nip/Tuck
 Amber Tamblyn – Joan of Arcadia

Best Actress – Musical or Comedy Series
Jane Kaczmarek – Malcolm in the Middle
 Lauren Graham – Gilmore Girls
 Bonnie Hunt – Life with Bonnie
 Debra Messing – Will & Grace
 Alicia Silverstone – Miss Match
 Wanda Sykes – Wanda at Large

Best Actress – Miniseries or TV Film
Meryl Streep – Angels in America
 Felicity Huffman – Out of Order
 Jessica Lange – Normal
 Helen Mirren – The Roman Spring of Mrs. Stone
 Mary Tyler Moore – Blessings
 Maggie Smith – My House in Umbria

Best Miniseries
 Angels in America
 Children of Dune
 Out of Order
 Doctor Zhivago
 Helen of Troy
 Hornblower: Loyalty

Best Series – Drama
 The Shield
 Boomtown
 Carnivàle
 Law & Order: Special Victims Unit
 Nip/Tuck
 Six Feet Under

Best Series – Musical or Comedy
 Arrested Development
 Da Ali G Show
 The Bernie Mac Show
 Curb Your Enthusiasm
 Kid Notorious
 Sex and the City

Best Supporting Actor – Drama Series
Neal McDonough – Boomtown
 Andy Hallett – Angel
 Hill Harper – The Handler
 Anthony Heald – Boston Public
 Michael Rosenbaum – Smallville
 Gregory Smith – Everwood

Best Supporting Actor – Musical or Comedy Series
Jeffrey Tambor – Arrested Development
 David Cross – Arrested Development
 David Alan Grier – Life with Bonnie
 Sean Hayes – Will & Grace
 Matt LeBlanc – Friends
 David Hyde Pierce – Frasier

Best Supporting Actor – Miniseries or TV Film
Justin Kirk – Angels in America
 Eion Bailey – And Starring Pancho Villa as Himself
 Chris Cooper – My House in Umbria
 Shawn Hatosy – Soldier's Girl
 Patrick Wilson – Angels in America
 Jeffrey Wright – Angels in America

Best Supporting Actress – Drama Series
Mary Steenburgen – Joan of Arcadia
 Amy Acker – Angel
 Adrienne Barbeau – Carnivàle
 Loretta Devine – Boston Public
 Lena Olin – Alias
 Gina Torres – Angel

Best Supporting Actress – Musical or Comedy Series
Jessica Walter – Arrested Development
 Kelly Bishop – Gilmore Girls
 Kim Cattrall – Sex and the City
 Jane Leeves – Frasier
 Christa Miller – Scrubs
 Portia de Rossi – Arrested Development

Best Supporting Actress – Miniseries or TV Film
Justine Bateman – Out of Order
 Jayne Atkinson – Our Town
 Anne Bancroft – The Roman Spring of Mrs. Stone
 Jane Curtin – Our Town
 Mary-Louise Parker – Angels in America
 Emma Thompson – Angels in America

Best TV Film
 Rudy: The Rudy Giuliani Story
 And Starring Pancho Villa as Himself
 My House in Umbria
 Normal
 Our Town
 Soldier's Girl

New Media winners and nominees

Best Classic DVD
Looney Tunes
 The Ace of Hearts, The Unknown, Laugh, Clown, Laugh, and Lon Chaney: A Thousand Faces (For "The Lon Chaney Collection".)
 From Russia with Love, You Only Live Twice, Diamonds Are Forever, Moonraker, For Your Eyes Only, The Living Daylights, The World Is Not Enough, Thunderball, On Her Majesty's Secret Service, Live and Let Die, Octopussy, A View to a Kill, and Die Another Day (For "The James Bond DVD Collection", volumes 2 & 3.)
 Modern Times, The Gold Rush, The Great Dictator, Limelight (For "The Charlie Chaplin Collection" (Warner).)
 Raiders of the Lost Ark, Indiana Jones and the Temple of Doom, and Indiana Jones and the Last Crusade (For "The Adventures of Indiana Jones" set.)
 Scarface

Best Documentary DVD
Lost in La Mancha
 The Blue Planet
 Canada: A People's History
 Gigantic (A Tale of Two Johns)
 Saturday Night Live – 25 Years of Music
 Trembling Before G-d

Best DVD Extras
Finding Nemo
Firefly
 Alien, Aliens, Alien3, and Alien Resurrection (For "The Alien Quadrilogy".)
 The Lord of the Rings: The Two Towers (For the Special Extended Edition.)
 Raiders of the Lost Ark, Indiana Jones and the Temple of Doom, and Indiana Jones and the Last Crusade (For "The Adventures of Indiana Jones" set.)
 Willard

Best DVD Release of TV Shows
Alias (For The Complete Second Season.)
 24 (For The Complete Second Season.)
 Dawson's Creek (For The Complete Second Season.)
 Family Guy (For Volume 2.)
 Mr. Show with Bob and David (For The Complete Third Season.)
 Star Trek: Deep Space Nine (For Season 7.)

Most Innovative Story Design
XIII
 PlanetSide
 Star Wars: Knights of the Old Republic
 The Sims: Superstar
 True Crime: Streets of LA

Outstanding Art Direction
The Lord of the Rings: The Return of the King
 Battlefield 1942 (For the add-on "The Road to Rome".)
 Final Fantasy XI
 Max Payne 2: The Fall of Max Payne
 SOCOM II U.S. Navy SEALs

Outstanding Character
Grand Theft Auto: Vice City For "Tommy Vercetti" (Ray Liotta).
 Def Jam Vendetta For "Def Jam Crew" ('DMX'/Ludacris/Method Man/Redman).
 True Crime: Streets of LA For "Unknown" (Snoop Dogg).
 XIII For the XIII Voice (David Duchovny).

Outstanding Execution of a Gaming Concept
Star Wars: Knights of the Old Republic
 Call of Duty
 Enter the Matrix
 Max Payne 2: The Fall of Max Payne
 SOCOM II U.S. Navy SEALs
 The Lord of the Rings: The Return of the King

Outstanding Overall DVD
The Lord of the Rings: The Two Towers (For the Special Extended Edition.)
 Alien, Aliens, Alien 3, and Alien Resurrection (For "The Alien Quadrilogy".)
 Jackass: The Movie
 Looney Tunes: The Golden Collection
 Pirates of the Caribbean: The Curse of the Black Pearl
 Raiders of the Lost Ark, Indiana Jones and the Temple of Doom, and Indiana Jones and the Last Crusade (For "The Adventures of Indiana Jones" set.)

Outstanding Youth DVD
The Lion King (For the Platinum Edition.)
 Barbie of Swan Lake
 Finding Nemo
 It's a Very Merry Muppet Christmas Movie
 Itty Bitty Heartbeats
 Hooves of Fire, and Legend of the Lost Tribe (Robbie the Reindeer – Hooves of Fire/Legend of the Lost Tribe (US Versions))

Awards breakdown

Film
Winners:
4 / 10 The Last Samurai: Best Cinematography / Best Costume Design / Best Editing / Best Original Score
3 / 5 Lost in Translation: Best Actor & Film – Musical or Comedy / Best Screenplay – Original
3 / 6 In America: Best Director / Best Film – Drama / Best Supporting Actor – Drama
2 / 7 Master and Commander: The Far Side of the World: Best Sound / Best Visual Effects
2 / 8 Mystic River: Best Actor – Drama / Best Screenplay – Adapted
1 / 1 Amandla!: A Revolution in Four-Part Harmony: Best Documentary Film
1 / 1 City of God (Cidade de Deus): Best Foreign Language Film
1 / 1 Monster: Best Actress – Drama
1 / 1 Something's Gotta Give: Best Actress – Musical or Comedy
1 / 1 The Triplets of Belleville (Les triplettes de Belleville): Best Animated or Mixed Media Film
1 / 2 Once Upon a Time in Mexico: Best Original Song
1 / 2 Pieces of April: Best Supporting Actress – Musical or Comedy
1 / 4 21 Grams: Best Actor – Drama
1 / 4 The Cooler: Best Supporting Actress – Drama
1 / 4 A Mighty Wind: Best Supporting Actor – Musical or Comedy
1 / 8 The Lord of the Rings: The Return of the King: Best Art Direction and Production Design

Losers:
0 / 8 Seabiscuit
0 / 6 Thirteen
0 / 5 American Splendor, Pirates of the Caribbean: The Curse of the Black Pearl
0 / 4 Kill Bill: Volume 1, Whale Rider
0 / 3 Cold Mountain, Love Actually
0 / 2 Bad Santa, Bend It Like Beckham, Brother Bear, Calendar Girls, Camp, Finding Nemo, House of Sand and Fog, Monsieur Ibrahim (Monsieur Ibrahim et les fleurs du Coran), Shattered Glass, The Station Agent

Television
Winners:
3 / 3 The Shield: Best Actor & Actress – Drama Series / Best Series – Drama
3 / 5 Arrested Development: Best Series – Musical or Comedy Series / Best Supporting Actor & Supporting Actress – Musical or Comedy Series
3 / 8 Angels in America: Best Actress & Supporting Actor – Miniseries or TV Film / Best Miniseries
2 / 2 Rudy: The Rudy Giuliani Story: Best Actor – Miniseries or TV Film / Best TV Film
1 / 2 The Bernie Mac Show: Best Actor – Musical or Comedy Series
1 / 2 Boomtown: Best Supporting Actor – Drama Series
1 / 2 Joan of Arcadia: Best Supporting Actress – Drama Series
1 / 2 Malcolm in the Middle: Best Actress – Musical or Comedy Series
1 / 3 Out of Order: Best Supporting Actress – Miniseries or TV Film

Losers:
0 / 4 Angel, Carnivàle, Soldier's Girl
0 / 3 Nip/Tuck, My House in Umbria, Normal, Will & Grace
0 / 2 Alias, Da Ali G Show, Curb Your Enthusiasm, Life with Bonnie, The Roman Spring of Mrs. Stone

References

Satellite Awards ceremonies
2003 awards
2003 film awards
2003 television awards